Buck Mountain may refer to:

Buck Mountain (Lassen, California) (8,634 feet), in the Warner Mountains
Buck Mountain (Palisades, California) (12,841 feet), in the Central Sierra Nevada
Buck Mountain (Colorado) (11,396 feet), in the Rocky Mountain's Park Range
Buck Mountain (Iron County, Missouri) (1,624 feet), in the Ozark Highlands
Buck Mountain (Madison County, Missouri) (1,129 feet), in the Ozark Highlands
Buck Mountain (St. Francois County, Missouri) (1,529 feet), in the Ozark Highlands
Buck Mountain (Montana) (3,327 feet), in the Pine Hills
Buck Mountain (Nevada) (9,159 feet), in the Ruby Mountains
Buck Mountain (Fort Ann, New York) (2,334 feet), in the Eastern Adirondacks
Buck Mountain (Long Lake, New York) (2,392 feet), South of Tupper Lake
Buck Mountain (Indian Lake, New York) (2,631 feet), in the Central Adirondacks
Buck Mountain (Saratoga, New York) (2,700 feet), in the Southern Adirondacks
Buck Mountain (Tupper Lake, New York) (2,917 feet), in the Northwest Adirondacks
Buck Mountain (Columbia, Oregon) (2,134 feet), in the Northern Oregon Coast Range
Buck Mountain (Pennsylvania) (1,942 feet), in the Ridge-and-Valley Appalachians
Buck Mountain (Tennessee) (3,900 feet), in the Blue Ridge Mountains
Buck Mountain (Virginia) (4,670 feet), in the Blue Ridge Mountains
Buck Mountain (Washington) (8,533 feet), in the North Cascades
Buck Mountain (Jefferson, Washington) (3,780 feet), in the Eastern Olympic Mountains
Buck Mountain (Wyoming) (11,943 feet), in Grand Teton National Park

See also
Buck Mountain Episcopal Church
Buck Peak (disambiguation)